Jeffrey Archer's Prison Diaries by FF 8282 is the authorised theatrical adaptation of Jeffrey Archer's three-volume diary of his time in jail (which was published as A Prison Diary). "FF 8282" was Archer's prisoner number while incarcerated.

Adapted and written by Norman Hudis as a one-man play, it is to be presented by West End theatre producer Marc Sinden.

References

Memoirs of imprisonment
Literature about literature
Plays based on actual events
Plays for one performer
Plays by Norman Hudis
Plays based on real people
Cultural depictions of writers
Cultural depictions of politicians
Cultural depictions of British men